Peter Reed may refer to:
 Pete Reed (born 1981), British Olympic gold medallist rower
 Peter Reed (athlete) (born 1943), British Olympic athlete
 Peter Reed (criminal), Australian criminal acquitted of the Russell Street Bombing

See also
Peter Read (disambiguation)
Peter Rede, English Member of Parliament for Dover, 1410–?
Peter Reid (disambiguation)